The Petroleum (Production) Act 1918 (8 & 9 Geo. 5 Chapter 52) is an Act of the Parliament of the United Kingdom which regulates the exploration and production of petroleum from underground strata.

Background 
In the early the twentieth century, Britain imported most of its petroleum from the Middle East and America. The First World War reduced access to some of these sources and increased the demand and use of petroleum. The government wanted to develop indigenous (UK) sources of petroleum but wished to avoid ‘wildcat’ development which had taken place in the USA. Legislation was therefore required  to control the petroleum industry. The regulatory regime allowed only agents of the Crown or those licensed by the Crown to search for, or produce, petroleum.

Petroleum (Production) Act 1918 
The Petroleum (Production) Act 1918 (8 & 9 Geo. 5 Chapter 52) received Royal Assent on 21 November 1918. Its long title is ‘An Act to make provision with respect to the searching and boring for and getting Petroleum, and for purposes connected therewith’.

Provisions 
The Act comprises 7 Sections

 Section 1 – Prohibition on persons other than the Crown getting etc. petroleum
 Section 2 – Powers of Minister of Munitions
 Section 3 – Powers to inspect plans of mines
 Section 4 – Records of petroleum gotten
 Section 5 – Interpretation
 Section 6 – Savings
 Section 7 – Short Title

Consequences 
Between the enactment of the 1918 Act and 1934 only seven licences were issued and by 1934 only three were in force.

The 1918 Act was repealed by the Petroleum (Production) Act 1934 which vested in the Crown the property in petroleum and natural gas within Great Britain.

See also 

 Petroleum Act

References 

History of the petroleum industry in the United Kingdom
United Kingdom Acts of Parliament 1918